Andrew Jordan, Jr. (born June 21, 1972) is a former professional American football tight end in the National Football League for eight seasons for the Minnesota Vikings, the Philadelphia Eagles, and the Tampa Bay Buccaneers.  He played college football at North Greenville University and Western Carolina University and was drafted in the sixth round of the 1994 NFL Draft.

1972 births
American football tight ends
Living people
Minnesota Vikings players
Players of American football from Charlotte, North Carolina
Philadelphia Eagles players
Tampa Bay Buccaneers players
Western Carolina Catamounts football players
Western Carolina University alumni